The Shell Grotto Nienoord is a shell grotto built around the year 1700 at the behest of Anna van Ewsum, in a cupola in the southern gardens of the former borg on the Nienoord estate in Leek, in the northeastern Netherlands.

The grotto was originally built as a treasury for the jonkheers of Nienoord. All that is known about the reason for covering the cupola's interior in shells, comes from a folk tale. 

This is not the only shell grotto in the Netherlands. Others can be found on the Rosendael Caste estate (Rozendaal, Gelderland, built in 1722) and in Het Loo Palace (Apeldoorn, Gelderland).

Gallery

References

Buildings and structures in Groningen (province)
Westerkwartier (municipality)
Shell grottoes